AISD may stand for:
Independent School Districts in Texas – A
American International School of Dhaka